Jinnai-ike  is an earthfill dam located in Kagawa Prefecture in Japan. The dam is used for irrigation. The catchment area of the dam is 12.4 km2. The dam impounds about 35  ha of land when full and can store 1160 thousand cubic meters of water. The construction of the dam was completed in 1969.

See also
List of dams in Japan

References

Dams in Kagawa Prefecture